25C-NBOMe (NBOMe-2C-C, 2C-C-NBOMe, Cimbi-82) is a psychedelic drug and derivative of the psychedelic phenethylamine 2C-C. 25C-NBOMe appeared on online vendor sites in 2010 but was not reported in the literature until 2011. It acts as a potent agonist of the 5HT2A receptor, and has been studied in its 11C radiolabelled form as a potential ligand for mapping the distribution of 5-HT2A receptors in the brain, using positron emission tomography (PET). Multiple deaths have occurred from usage of 25C-NBOMe due to the ease of accidental overdose. The long-term toxic effects of the drug have not been researched.

History
25C-NBOMe is derived from the psychedelic phenethylamine 2C-C by substitution on the amine with a 2-methoxybenzyl group. 25C-NBOMe is a clumpy white powder with a notably bitter and metallic taste. 25C-NBOMe has been found on blotter mimics sold as LSD.

Dosage

25C-NBOMe is extremely potent and the effects of the drug increase greatly within a small window of dosage adjustment. Overdose may occur at as little as double an average dose. With inaccurate dosing of street blotter paper, when mistaken for LSD, or when taken as a powder or liquid, this has resulted in multiple accidental deaths.

One study has shown that 25C-NBOMe blotters have 'hotspots' of the drug and the dosage is not evenly applied over the surface of the paper, which could lead to overdose. Sublingually, the threshold for the onset of hallucinogenic effects reportedly is about 100–250 μg, with mild effects at 250–450, strong effects at 450–800, and very strong effects over 800 μg.

NBOMe-substituted compounds have a diminished absorption rate passing through mucus membranes, but generally remain inactive when taken orally. Buccal, sublingual or insufflated routes of administration are all viable options. Absorption rate buccally and sublingually can be increased when complexed with HPBCD complexing sugar, however the most efficient is nasal administration, which shortens the duration while increasing intensity, but has been attributed to several overdoses and deaths.

Effects

Desired 
 strong open- and closed-eye visuals, including trails, color shifts, brightening, etc.
 mood lift
 euphoria
 mental and physical stimulation
 increase in associative & creative thinking
 increased awareness & appreciation of music
 life-changing spiritual experiences
 feelings of love and empathy
 increased pattern recognition (psychology)
 synesthesia and chromesthesia (intensified for those who experience these while sober)

Neutral 
 general change in consciousness
 pupil dilation
 unusual body sensations (paresthesia, flushing, chills, goose bumps)
 change in perception of time, time dilation
 increased heart rate
 jaw clenching (bruxism)
 yawning, especially when coming up
 insomnia
 looping, recursive, out-of-control thinking
 dissociation

Undesired 
(Includes negative side effects arising from overdose; likelihood of negative side effects increases with dose)
 confusion and difficulty focusing
 scrambled communication
 tunnel vision
 vasoconstriction
 nausea and vomiting (normally only during the onset for those affected)
 paranoia, fear, and panic
 irritation of the throat
 irritation of mucous membranes
 upper respiratory irritation and difficulty breathing/swallowing
 unwanted and overwhelming feelings or life-changing spiritual experiences
 syncope
 shaking
 dystonia, clonus and seizure
 death

Toxicity and harm potential 

25C-NBOMe overdoses have caused many cases of multi-organ failure and death worldwide. NBOMe chemicals, including 25C-NBOMe, frequently cause tachycardia (rapid heart rate), hypertension (high blood pressure), and vasoconstriction (which reduces blood flow). These physical symptoms can cause significant risks to health, especially when the user has underlying health issues or has taken a combination of drugs. 25C-NBOMe is significantly more dangerous and potent than LSD, which is not easily overdosed.

25C-NBOme is a substituted para-Chloroamphetamine which is a known neurotoxin. 25C-NBOMe being much more potent and a direct serotonergic neurotoxic agent.

25C-NBOme has been shown in preliminary studies to be toxic to development, heart health and brain health in zebrafish, rats, and brine shrimp (common model organisms for studying potential drug effects on humans), but more research is needed on this topic, the dosages, and if this applies to humans. The authors of one study recommended further research on if the drug is potentially damaging to pregnant women and their fetuses due to the potentially damaging effects to development.

While most deaths are due to the physical effects of the drug, one person died after repeatedly running into walls while under the effects of 25C-NBOMe, 25B-NBOMe and MDMA; this person had thought the NBOMe drugs they had taken were LSD. Another died while drowning while under the effects of 25C-NBOMe and 25H-NBOMe, shortly after expressing they wished to commit suicide.

Drug prohibition laws

Canada
As of October 31, 2016; 25C-NBOMe is a controlled substance (Schedule III) in Canada. http://gazette.gc.ca/rp-pr/p2/2016/2016-05-04/html/sor-dors72-eng.php

Israel 
The NBOMe series of psychoactives became controlled in Israel in May, 2013.

New Zealand 
25C-NBOMe was sold as a designer drug in New Zealand in early 2012, but was withdrawn from sale after a statement by Associate Health Minister Peter Dunne that 25C-NBOMe would be considered to be substantially similar in chemical structure to the illegal hallucinogen DOB, and was therefore a Class C controlled drug analogue.

Russia 
Russia became the first country to regulate the NBOME class. The entire NBOMe series of psychoactives became controlled in the Russian Federation starting October, 2011.

Sweden 
Sveriges riksdag added 25C-NBOMe to schedule I ("substances, plant materials and fungi which normally do not have medical use") as narcotics in Sweden as of Aug 1, 2013, published by Medical Products Agency in their regulation LVFS 2013:15 listed as 25C-NBOMe 2-(4-kloro-2,5-dimetoxifenyl)-N-(2-metoxibensyl)etanamin.

United Kingdom

United States 
Several NBOMe series compounds will be temporarily scheduled in the United States for 2 years. The temporary scheduling applies to 25C-NBOMe, 25B-NBOMe, and 25I-NBOMe. In November 2015, the temporary scheduling was extended for another year.

China 
As of October 2015 25C-NBOMe is a controlled substance in China.

Czech Republic 
25C-NBOMe is banned in the Czech Republic.

Analogues and derivatives

References

25-NB (psychedelics)
Chlorobenzenes
Designer drugs